Padideh Boloorizadeh (born in December 1974 in Tehran) is an Iranian track and field athlete and volleyball player.

Padideh started track and field at a very young age and started setting new records. She set a new record of 1.64 meters for the Iranian women's high jump in 1996 after 23 years. She also broke Iran's record in different events pentathlon, heptathlon and 60 meter hurdles in Iran.
Padideh is an IAAF level 4 jumps coach and a level 2 IAAF coaching course lecturer. She coached several Iranian sprinters and combined event athletes that led to new national records and Asian podium during the years.

Other than track and field, she has been involved in volleyball and was a member of the Iranian national volleyball team for many years. She was selected as Iran Women National Volleyball team captain in 2004 to lead the team in their first attendance in the Women's Asian Volleyball Championships.
She is a FIVB certified level 2 coach and served the national and select club teams as strength and conditioning and assistant coach after retiring from playing herself.
She worked for Iran University of science and technology since 1992, while teaching at an invitee course instructor at Islamic Azad University, Shahid Beheshty University, Alzahra University as well as  Iran Olympic Academy, Volleyball and Athletics federations as the coaching course lecturer. She also worked at Athletics Canada as the manager in coach development and training.
She holds a PhD in sport management and planning from Islamic Azad University-Central Tehran branch.

References

irib.ir

Living people
1974 births
Iranian women's volleyball players
Pentathletes
Iranian female high jumpers
Heptathletes
Iranian female long jumpers
Iranian female hurdlers